The Nissan Leopard is a line of sport/luxury cars built by Japanese carmaker Nissan. The Leopard began life in 1980 and was discontinued in 1999. The Leopard were initially based on the Japanese market Nissan Skyline and Nissan Laurel, then later based on the chassis of their Nissan Cedric and Nissan Gloria contemporaries and were rear wheel drive. Final versions were the contributing factors to Nissan's Infiniti M and J products.

The Leopard sedan was sold exclusively in Japan at Nissan Bluebird Store locations as a companion to the Fairlady Z, allowing Nissan to sell a badge engineered version of the Skyline and Laurel, while the coupe was exclusive to Nissan Motor Store locations. The Leopard was cancelled as a result of the Nissan Revival Plan, a casualty of overproduction. It was succeeded by the Nissan Fuga.



First generation: F30 (1980-1986)

The first Leopard (also known as Leopard TR-X) was introduced in September 1980 as a contender in the upper medium class of cars, including its primary Toyota contender, the Toyota Chaser. The angular body, available as a two-door hardtop coupé "personal luxury car", and a four-door hardtop sedan, which featured very slim C- and D-pillars and large glass surfaces. The coupé featured a "glass-to-glass" rear window sharing the very slim C- and D-pillars from the sedan. The angular appearance was shared with the Fairlady Z, but the coupé was exclusive to Nissan Motor Store locations, while the sedan was exclusive to Nissan Bluebird Store Japanese Nissan dealerships. The coupé replaced the Nissan Cedric/Gloria coupé and the Nissan Laurel coupé. The wind resistance coefficient of the two-door version is 0.37. At the time of introduction, the two body styles both carried the same price tags. The Leopard featured some industry firsts, for instance a fuel consumption gauge in the dashboard.

Originally the Leopard was available with naturally aspirated inline four- and six-cylinder engines of 1,800, 2,000, and 2,800 cc displacement; the largest engine received an electronic engine management system developed together with Hitachi, and was called NAPS-Z. The 1.8 liter fours were also originally available with a four-speed manual transmission, all others received five-speeds as standard (or an optional three-speed automatic). In July 1981 a two-liter turbocharged engine was added. Available as a GX, SGX, and ZGX, it had the same maximum output (145 PS) as did the more expensive and heavier 2.8.

In September 1982, the Leopard received a mild facelift and with it, the under-performing 2.8 was dropped from the lineup. In June 1984 a limited Turbo Grand Edition with the 300ZX's  3 litre turbo engine joined the line-up.

The car shared many components with the six-cylinder version of the Datsun Bluebird 910, sold in North America as the Datsun 810 (and later renamed the Nissan Maxima), but used a platform based on the Nissan Skyline R30. The Japanese version had side view mirrors mounted on the front fenders and (uniquely) had small wipers attached to the top of the mirrors to remove accumulated rain and dirt from the surface of the mirrors. The vehicle's styling seemed to be influenced by its more successful main competitor, the Toyota Soarer. However, when the Leopard was introduced, the styling was already a little dated and the coupé-only Soarer did significantly better in the market.

A list of the various trim levels and engines that the Leopard was available with at its introduction. The 2-liter engine gave Japanese buyers the option of paying less annual road tax:

After a mild styling update in late 1982, the car was offered in the following variations:
180X GX, SGX
200X SGX, ZGX
200 Turbo SGX, ZGX, ZGX Super Edition
300 Turbo Grand Edition

Second generation: F31 (1986-1992)

The F31 Leopard appeared in February 1986 and was only available as a luxury GT coupé. This vehicle shared a platform with the Nissan Skyline R31, Nissan Cefiro A31, and the Nissan Laurel C32 to share development costs.

The F31 Leopard was directly competing mainly to the Toyota Soarer, Mazda Cosmo, and the Honda Legend coupé in 1986. Whereas Toyota offered the Soarer with several iterations of its two liter inline six and the single turbo 7M-GTE, Nissan had either non-turbo or turbo V6 inside its, then new, Leopard. The displacements of the engines were of either a 2.0L or a 3.0L, and they were the VG30DET, VG30DE, VG20DET (post 1988), VG20ET (prior to 1988), and VG20E. Early 2.0 turbo versions had the single-cam (per bank) VG20ET, but from August 1988, the quad cam version appeared. The bodywork was also facelifted at this time, and now featured a somewhat smoother front appearance. It was the facelifted version that was exported to the USA, and approximately 12,000 Leopards were sold (with around 6,000 of those being converted to convertibles by ASC). In the USA, the F31 was called the Infiniti M30. Output of the VG30DE engine also increased marginally at the time of the facelift. Available in top spec form was the new turbocharged 3 litre VG30DET engine which produces . Only the smaller VG20ET and VG20DET engines had intercoolers.

The installation of 2.0 L engines in shorter vehicles was that so the lower trim packages offered Japanese buyers the ability to purchase a luxury coupé that didn't incur a yearly tax for owning a vehicle that didn't comply with Japanese Government dimension regulations. The use of a smaller engine also offered Japanese buyers yearly road tax savings.

The angular bodywork was reflected in the companion fastback sportscar, called the Fairlady ZX, but the coupé remained exclusive to the Nissan Motor Store locations in Japan. The Leopard's more traditional coupé styling was offered as an alternative to the Fairlady ZX's fastback appearance.

Trim packages started with the top level Ultima Grand Selection with the 3.0 V6 engine, the Ultima with the 3.0 V6, (later the Ultima received the 3.0 V6 turbo), the XS-II Grand Selection with the 2.0 V6 Turbo, the XS-II with the 2.0 V6 Turbo, the XS with the V6 Turbo, the XJ-II with a 2.0 V6 and the base model called the XJ with the 2.0 V6. All models came with a digital instrument cluster, all models except the XS and the XJ came with stereo and cruise control buttons installed in the steering wheel center pad, and both Grand Selection models were installed with a 6-inch TV screen installed in the dashboard below the A/C controls that allowed passengers to watch broadcast TV if the transmission was in Park and the parking brake applied. The video entertainment system also had RCA connections to attach a camcorder and watch recorded video. The stereo and video equipment was supplied by Sony. On top of that, the Ultima models featured a keyless entry card.

The Leopard F31 had few factory options, but dealers offered the addition of a cellular phone installed in a dedicated compartment in the dashboard above the glove compartment where a modern passenger side airbag would now be located, and a choice of a cassette tape changer with a separate single disc CD player later upgraded to a CD changer. Catering to Japanese tastes for luxury, the Leopard wasn't available in leather for all trim packages, with wool interior offered on the top three trim packages. The front passenger seat was also equipped with what Nissan called "Partner Comfort Seat" where the top portion of the front passenger seat was further articulated to tilt forward, supporting the passengers shoulders while allowing the seatback structure to recline. The front edge of the passenger seat cushion was also adjustable. This was created by Dr. Yoshiyuki Matsuoka who worked for Nissan starting in 1982.

Like the Skyline and Fairlady ZX, the Leopard coupé was a front-engined and rear-wheel drive vehicle. The RE4R01A four-speed automatic with electronic overdrive was used as well as a five-speed manual transmission, which was only available in the domestic Japanese market on the lower trim level XJ-II and the XJ 2.0 V6 without a turbo. The differential was a Nissan R200-type open differential.

The Leopard F31 was equipped with the DUET-SS "Super Sonic Suspension" II system that was also installed on other Nissan vehicles at the time, which featured a sonar module mounted under the front bumper that scanned the road surface and adjusted the suspension accordingly via actuators mounted on the strut towers. There was also a switch on the center console that allowed the driver to change between "Auto", "Soft", "Medium" and "Hard" settings on all models except the XS model, which removed the "Auto" selection.

The Leopard F31's production run lasted for seven years, ending in June 1992 due to lagging sales. Seven years was very long by period Japanese standards, nearly equating the runs of two generations of most Japanese cars of the time. Nobody knows exactly how many Infiniti M30 were produced for the US market, but it has been said that just over 17,000 were made. It is unknown how many were coupés and how many were convertibles; the convertible was only available in 1991 and 1992. 38,000 F31 Leopards were sold in Japan during its seven-year production span.

Third generation: Y32 (1992-1996)

The third generation was called Leopard J Ferie (jour férié is French for holiday) and appeared in June 1992. The word Ferie was (almost) shared with the Honda Civic Ferio sold at the same time. The use of the word "holiday" in an automobile name was previously done by Oldsmobile for products manufactured in the 1950s and 1960s with a hardtop bodystyle. It came only in the saloon bodystyle and followed the rounded shape of Bluebirds, Altimas, NX, and its companion sports car offering at Nissan Bluebird Store Japanese dealerships, the Fairlady ZX during this time period. It was sold in North America as the Infiniti J30. All J30s/Leopard J Feries were built in Tochigi, Tochigi, Japan. Production of the Y32 Leopard ended on June 18, 1997. It had a MacPherson strut front suspension with a multi-link suspension for the rear wheels, and utilized HICAS, Nissan's four wheel steering technology. The Y32 Leopard was a rear wheel drive luxury car that started production April 7, 1992 as a 1993 model to replace the Nissan Leopard F31 (which was a 2-door coupé), and was launched in Japan after its competitor, the Toyota Aristo.

The car was designed to slot between the smaller Nissan Primera and the larger Nissan Cedric, yet it shared a market position with the Nissan Cefiro and the Nissan Laurel, sold at different Nissan Japan sales channels. Also, it was fairly small and featured rounded styling uncharacteristic of the crowded executive luxury car class. The styling was meant to convey a more sport-minded appearance, in comparison to the Nissan Cedric, Gloria and Cima, on which this car shared a platform, that is now reminiscent of a four-door coupé. The chief exterior designer for the J30 was Jerry Hirshberg, president of Nissan Design International (NDI), who was responsible for the 1971-1973 Buick Riviera.

While it shares the Y32 Chassis with the Nissan Cedric/Gloria, it was also related to the Nissan Cima where it was offered with both the VG30DE and VH41DE V8. No turbo was available on this particular Leopard sedan. In Japan, three trim levels were offered, with the Type F offered with the VG30DE V6, the Type X with VH41DE V8 and a shared equipment level with the Type F, followed by the Type X-S sharing the equivalent content level with the North American V6 equipped J30, and the Type L which had the same equipment level as the Type X with the smaller V6 engine shared with the Type L-S sharing the equipment package with the Type X-S also V6 equipped. The V8 claimed  in Japanese specifications.

This generation was the first time an engine with a displacement under 2.0 L wasn't offered in Japan, and resulted in Japanese buyers being liable for a higher annual road tax bill which affected sales.

To establish that this was a luxury vehicle, the plush leather interior was designed with assistance from Poltrona Frau of Italy. The seats were made by Poltrona Frau at a rate of only five a day. The interior treatment continued to use the contrasting arrangement used in the larger Nissan Infiniti Q45 with a dark color used for the dashboard, and center console, with a lighter shade color used inside for the seats, interior door panels, headliner, carpet, and carpeted floor mats. The driver's side window controls had an unusual placement in that the drivers window switch was both one-touch express down and double-sized, meaning it was the same width as two conventional window switches towards the top, with the front and rear passenger window switches further down, with the window lockout switch installed next to the front passenger switch, instead of the drivers window switch. The front passenger and rear passenger window switches were thumb activated, installed at the top of the interior door pull handle. This version of the Leopard was the first car sold in Japan to include a passenger-side airbag as standard equipment.

One of the numerous reasons the Y32 Leopard didn't meet projected sales goals was that its most distinguishing feature was a lack of interior room. It had the distinction of being a mid-size car with the space of a subcompact (less than a Sunny) due to its sloping roofline and rounded down trunk. The styling of the vehicle was more favorably regarded in Japan than it was in the USA. Total production of this vehicle was around 7,000 units internationally.

Information for this section of the article was translated from Leopard J Ferie.com

Fourth generation: Y33 (1996-1999)

The fourth and last generation of the Leopard, introduced in March 1996, again was offered as a hardtop sedan only, using  frameless side windows with a "B" pillar. The "J Ferie" name was dropped for this version of the Leopard. It was based on the Y33 Cedric/Gloria and Cima chassis.

As the economic downturn of the post-"Japanese bubble economy" began to take effect, the Leopard suffered diminished sales, and directly competed with other Nissan large sedans and performance cars, and was discontinued.

It wasn't available in North America where the Infiniti mid-range had been replaced by the Nissan Cefiro/Infiniti I30. A V8 engine was no longer offered, and AWD was offered with the RB25DET turbocharged straight-six engine, borrowed from the Skyline. This vehicle also utilized Nissan's direct fuel injection engine configuration, which supplied fuel directly inside the engine cylinder, instead of inside the intake manifold just before entering the cylinders.

External links
 Nissan Sedan history (japanese site)

References

Leopard
Grand tourers
Vehicles with four-wheel steering
All-wheel-drive vehicles
Cars introduced in 1980

1990s cars
Cars discontinued in 1999